Tabler Station is an unincorporated community in Berkeley County, West Virginia, United States. It lies on County Route 32, south of Martinsburg off U.S. Route 11 near Eastern West Virginia Regional Airport.

The community most likely was named after the local Tabler family. The Tabler's Station Historic District is listed on the National Register of Historic Places.

References

Unincorporated communities in Berkeley County, West Virginia
Unincorporated communities in West Virginia